Travis Walton (born August 24, 1987) is an American former professional basketball player, and assistant coach with the Agua Caliente Clippers. Previously, he was an assistant coach with the Salt Lake City Stars of the NBA G League. He played college basketball at Michigan State University. In 2009, he was selected as the Big Ten Defensive Player of the Year. Travis was born in Lima, Ohio to Lakita and Nathaniel Walton. Walton played four consecutive years in Lima for Lima Senior. He was also recruited by Marquette. 

Walton played for the Detroit Pistons in the 2009 NBA Summer League. He then played in Europe in Switzerland and Germany. Walton played in the NBA D-League for the Dakota Wizards in 2011. In 2012, he played for the Fort Wayne Mad Ants and the Canton Charge.

According to a report from ESPN's "Outside the Lines," in 2010 Walton allegedly struck a female bar patron twice on the face, with the force of the blow knocking her off her barstool. Walton was charged with assault and battery, but the case was dismissed on April 10, 2010.

References

External links
 Walton transitions to sidelines: Lima Senior, Michigan State grad starts coaching career in NBA D-League 
 Biography from Michigan State University
 Profile at Eurobasket.com

1987 births
Living people
Agua Caliente Clippers coaches
American expatriate basketball people in Germany
American expatriate basketball people in Switzerland
Basketball coaches from Ohio
Basketball players from Ohio
Canton Charge players
Dakota Wizards players
Fort Wayne Mad Ants players
Idaho Stampede coaches
Lugano Tigers players
Michigan State Spartans men's basketball players
Ratiopharm Ulm players
Salt Lake City Stars coaches
Sportspeople from Lima, Ohio
American men's basketball players
Guards (basketball)